Amlan Borgohain (born 25 April 1998) is an Indian track and field athlete who specializes in 100 metres and 200 metres. He holds the Indian national record for 100 metres and 200 metres.. He broke the existing national record for 200 metres in April 2022 and became the fastest Indian by breaking the national record for 100 metres in August 2022. 

At the 2022 edition of India's National Games, he won the Gold in both 100 metres and 200 metres.

References

External links 

 

1998 births
Living people
21st-century Indian people